The 1976 United States presidential election in Pennsylvania took place on November 2, 1976, and was part of the 1976 United States presidential election. Voters chose 27 representatives, or electors to the Electoral College, who voted for president and vice president.

Pennsylvania voted for the Democratic nominee, former Governor Jimmy Carter, over the Republican nominee, President Gerald Ford. Carter won Pennsylvania by a margin of 2.67%, which made Pennsylvania roughly 0.6% more Democratic than the nation at large.

While President Ford won more counties by running up victories in the central region of the state and the Philadelphia suburbs, Governor Carter swept Southwestern Pennsylvania where Pittsburgh is located, Erie County (Erie), Lackawanna County (Scranton), and Philadelphia.

, this is the last presidential election where the Democratic candidate won Pennsylvania without carrying any of Philadelphia’s suburban counties. This is also the only election since 1940 in which Pennsylvania voted for a different candidate than nearby Michigan, and the last time that Pennsylvania has voted to the right of Florida or Texas. This was the last time Pennsylvania and New Jersey voted for different candidates until 2016.

Results

Results by county

See also
 List of United States presidential elections in Pennsylvania

Notes

References

Pennsylvania
1976
1976 Pennsylvania elections